The 2000 Boston Red Sox season was the 100th season in the franchise's Major League Baseball history. The Red Sox finished second in the American League East with a record of 85 wins and 77 losses,  games behind the New York Yankees, who went on to win the 2000 World Series. The Red Sox did not qualify for the postseason, as the AL wild card went to the Seattle Mariners, who had finished second in the American League West with a record of 91–71.

Regular season 
 Pedro Martínez became the first pitcher in Major League history to amass more than twice as many strikeouts (284) than hits allowed (128) in a season.

Season standings

Record vs. opponents

Transactions 
 April 26, 2000: Curtis Pride was sent to the Boston Red Sox by the New York Mets as part of a conditional deal.
 June 5, 2000: Freddy Sanchez was drafted by the Boston Red Sox in the 11th round of the 2000 amateur draft. Player signed June 14, 2000.
 July 2, 2000: Hanley Ramirez was signed by the Boston Red Sox as an amateur free agent.
 July 8, 2000: Curtis Pride was released by the Boston Red Sox.
 August 3, 2000: Rico Brogna was selected off waivers by the Boston Red Sox from the Philadelphia Phillies.
 August 31, 2000: Dante Bichette was obtained by the Boston Red Sox from the Cincinnati Reds in exchange for Chris Reitsma and minor leaguer John Curtice.
 August 31, 2000: Midre Cummings was traded by the Minnesota Twins to the Boston Red Sox for Hector De Los Santos (minors).
 September 9, 2000: Lew Ford was traded by the Boston Red Sox to the Minnesota Twins for Hector Carrasco.

Opening Day Line Up

Roster

Player stats

Batting

Starters by position 
Note: Pos = Position; G = Games played; AB = At bats; H = Hits; Avg. = Batting average; HR = Home runs; RBI = Runs batted in; SB = Stolen Bases

Other batters 
Note: G = Games played; AB = At bats; H = Hits; Avg. = Batting average; HR = Home runs; RBI = Runs batted in; SB = Stolen bases

Pitching

Starting pitchers 
Note: G = Games pitched; GS = Games started; IP = Innings pitched; W = Wins; L = Losses; SV = Saves; ERA = Earned run average; SO = Strikeouts

Relief pitchers 
Note: G = Games pitched; IP = Innings pitched; W = Wins; L = Losses; SV = Saves; ERA = Earned run average; SO = Strikeouts

Other pitchers 
Note: G = Games pitched; GS = Games started; IP = Innings pitched; W = Wins; L = Losses; SV = Saves; ERA = Earned run average

Game log 

|- style="text-align:center; background-color:#bfb;"
| 1 || April 4 || @ Mariners  || 2–0 || P. Martínez (1–0) || Moyer (0–1) || Lowe (1) || Safeco Field || 45,552 || 1–0 || W1
|- style="text-align:center; background-color:#fbb;"
| 2 || April 5 || @ Mariners  || 3–9 || García (1–0) || R. Martínez (0–1) || — || Safeco Field || 29,242  || 1–1 || L1
|- style="text-align:center; background-color:#fbb;"
| 3 || April 6 || @ Mariners  || 2–5 || Mesa (1–0)  || Florie (0–1) || Sasaki (1) || Safeco Field || 25,121 || 1–2 || L2
|- style="text-align:center; background-color:#fbb;"
| 4 || April 7 || @ Angels  || 3–7 || Dickson (1–0)  || Schourek (0–1)  || — || Edison Field || 30,412 || 1–3 || L3
|- style="text-align:center; background-color:#fbb;"
| 5 || April 8 || @ Angels || 5–7 || Hill (1–1) || Rose (0–1) || Percival (1) || Edison Field || 27,369 || 1–4 || L4
|- style="text-align:center; background-color:#bfb;"
| 6 || April 9 || @ Angels  || 5–2 || P. Martínez (2–0) || Bottenfield (0–1) || — || Edison Field || 38,847 || 2–4 || W1
|- style="text-align:center; background-color:#bfb;"
| 7 || April 11 || Twins  || 13–5 || R. Martínez (1–1) || Mays (0–1) || — || Fenway Park || 33,114 || 3–4 || W2
|- style="text-align:center; background-color:#bfb;"
| 8 || April 12 || Twins  || 7–3  || Fassero (1–0) || Santana (0–1) || — || Fenway Park || 20,313 || 4–4 || W2
|- style="text-align:center; background-color:#bfb"
| 9 || April 13 || Twins || 4–3 || Wakefield (1–0) || Wells (0–1) || Lowe (2) || Fenway Park || 22,194 || 5–4 || W4
|- style="text-align:center; background-color:#fbb"
| 10 || April 14 || Athletics || 3–2 || Appier (2–1) || Rose (0–2) || — || Fenway Park || 29,472 || 5–5 || L1
|- style="text-align:center; background-color:#bfb"
| 11 || April 15 || Athletics || 14–2 || P. Martínez (3–0) || Hudson (1–1) || — || Fenway Park || 33,122 || 6–4 || W1
|- style="text-align:center; background-color:#bfb"
| 12 || April 16 || Athletics || 5–4 || Lowe (1–0) || Mathews (0–1) || — || Fenway Park || 32,385 || 7–5 || W2
|- style="text-align:center; background-color:#fbb"
| 13 || April 17 || Athletics || 0–1 || Heredia (1–1) || Fassero (1–1) || Isringhausen (2) || Fenway Park || 33,240 || 7–6 || L1
|- style="text-align:center; background-color:#bfb"
| 14 || April 18 || @ Tigers || 7–0 || Schourek (1–1) || Mlicki (0–3) || Lowe (3) || Comerica Park || 21,632 || 8–6 || W1
|- style="text-align:center; background-color:#bfb"
| 15 || April 19 || @ Tigers || 10–0 || Rose (1–2) || Nomo (1–1) || — || Comerica Park || 20,526 || 9–6 || W2
|- style="text-align:center; background-color:#bbb"
| — || April 20 || @ Tigers  || colspan=8|Postponed (rain). Makeup date September 16.
|- style="text-align:center; background-color:#bbb"
| — || April 21 || Indians  || colspan=8|Postponed (rain). Makeup date June 8.
|- style="text-align:center; background-color:#bbb"
| — || April 22 || Indians  || colspan=8|Postponed (rain). Makeup date September 20.
|- style="text-align:center; background-color:#bbb"
| — || April 23 || Indians  || colspan=8|Postponed (rain). Makeup date September 21.
|- style="text-align:center; background-color:#fbb;"
| 16 || April 24 || @ Rangers || 4–5 || Rogers (2–3) || Wakefield (1–1) || Wetteland (2) || The Ballpark at Arlington || 26,940 || 9–7 || L1
|- style="text-align:center; background-color:#bfb;"
| 17 || April 25 || @ Rangers || 6–3 || P. Martínez (4–0) || Helling (2–1) || Lowe (4) || The Ballpark at Arlington || 31,692 || 10–7 || W1
|- style="text-align:center; background-color:#bfb;"
| 18 || April 26 || @ Rangers || 14–4 || Fassero (2–1) || Clark (2–2) || — || The Ballpark at Arlington || 28,698 || 11–7 || W2
|- style="text-align:center; background-color:#fbb;"
| 19 || April 28 || @ Indians || 3–4 || Burba (3–1) || Schourek (1–2) || Karsay (3) || Jacobs Field || 42,885 || 11–8 || L1
|- style="text-align:center; background-color:#fbb;"
| 20 || April 29 || @ Indians  || 2–3 || Finley (3–0) || R. Martínez (1–2) || Karsay (4) || Jacobs Field || 42,453 || 11–9 || L2
|- style="text-align:center; background-color:#bfb;"
| 21 || April 30 || @ Indians || 2–1 || P. Martínez (5–0) || Nagy (1–4) || Lowe (5) || Jacobs Field || 42,065 || 12–9 || W1
|-

|- style="text-align:center; background-color:#bfb"
| 22 || May 1 || Tigers || 10–6 || Fassero (3–1) || Nitkowski (1–5) || — || Fenway Park || 24,087 || 13–9 || W2
|- style="text-align:center; background-color:#fbb"
| 23 || May 2 || Tigers || 7–6 (12)|| Blair (0–1) || Wakefield (1–2) || Jones (5) || Fenway Park || 22,857 || 13–10 || L1 
|- style="text-align:center; background-color:#bfb;"
| 24 || May 3 || Tigers || 4–2 || Lowe (2–0) || Weaver (0–4) || — || Fenway Park || 27,397 || 14–10 || W1 
|- style="text-align:center; background-color:#bfb;"
| 25 || May 5 || Devil Rays || 5–3 || R. Martínez (2–2) || Eiland (1–1) || Lowe (6) || Fenway Park || 32,479 || 15–10 || W2
|- style="text-align:center; background-color:#fbb;"
| 26 || May 6 || Devil Rays || 0–1 || Trachsel (2–2) || P. Martínez (5–1) || — || Fenway Park || 32,497 || 15–11 || L1 
|- style="text-align:center; background-color:#bfb;"
| 27 || May 7 || Devil Rays || 9–7 || Fassero (4–1) || Rekar (0–1) || Lowe (7) || Fenway Park || 32,336 || 16–11 || W1 
|- style="text-align:center; background-color:#bfb;"
| 28 || May 8 || White Sox || 3–2 || Rose (2–2) || Sturtze (1–2) || Lowe (8) || Fenway Park || 23,468 || 17–11 || W2 
|- style="text-align:center; background-color:#fbb;"
| 29 || May 9 || White Sox || 0–6 || Baldwin (6–0) || Schourek (1–3) || — || Fenway Park || 25,371 || 17–12 || L1 
|- style="text-align:center; background-color:#bfb;"
| 30 || May 10 || White Sox || 5–3 (6)|| R. Martínez (3–2) || Eldred (2–2) || Garcés (1) || Fenway Park || 28,911 || 18–12 || W1
|- style="text-align:center; background-color:#bfb;"
| 31 || May 11 || @ Orioles || 11–4 || Cormier (1–0) || Mercedes (2–2) || — || Camden Yards || 43,619 || 19–12 || W2 
|- style="text-align:center; background-color:#bfb;"
| 32 || May 12 || @ Orioles || 9–0 ||P. Martínez (6–1) || Ponson (2–2) || — || Camden Yards || 48,354 || 20–12 || W3 
|- style="text-align:center; background-color:#bfb;"
| 33 || May 13 || @ Orioles || 5–1 || Garcés (1–0) || Trombley (2–2) || — || Camden Yards || 48,579 || 21–12 || W4 
|- style="text-align:center; background-color:#bfb"
| 34 || May 14 || @ Orioles || 10–1 || Rose (3–2) || Mussina (1–5) || — || Camden Yards || 46,107 || 22–12 || W5 
|- style="text-align:center; background-color:#bfb"
| 35 || May 15 || @ Blue Jays || 8–1 || Schourek (2–3) || Castillo (1–3) || — || SkyDome || 16,124 || 23–12 || W6 
|- style="text-align:center; background-color:#fbb"
| 36 || May 16 || @ Blue Jays || 6–7 || Munro (1–0) || Lowe (2–1) || — || SkyDome || 17,663 || 23–13 || L1 
|- style="text-align:center; background-color:#bfb"
| 37 || May 17 || @ Blue Jays || 8–0 || P. Martínez (7–1) || Carpenter (3–5) || — || SkyDome || 20,078 || 24–13 || W1 
|- style="text-align:center; background-color:#bfb"
| 38 || May 19 || Tigers || 3–0 || Fassero (5–1) || Moehler (1–2) || Lowe (9) || Fenway Park || 31,973 || 25–13 || W2
|- style="text-align:center; background-color:#fbb"
| 39 || May 20 || Tigers || 1–2 || Mlicki (2–5) || Wakefield (1–3) || Jones (11) || Fenway Park || 31,909 || 25–14 || L1
|- style="text-align:center; background-color:#fbb"
| 40 || May 21 || Tigers || 5–7 || Nomo (2–3) || R. Martínez (3–3) || Jones (12) || Fenway Park || 31,893 || 25–15 || L2 
|- style="text-align:center; background-color:#fbb;"
| 41 || May 23 || Blue Jays || 2–3 || Carpenter (4–5) || P. Martínez (7–2) || Koch (10) || Fenway Park || 33,402 || 25–16 || L3 
|- style="text-align:center; background-color:#bfb;"
| 42 || May 24 || Blue Jays || 6–3 (11)|| Cormier (2–0) || Frascatore (0–1) || — || Fenway Park || 31,250 || 26–16 || W1 
|- style="text-align:center; background-color:#fbb;"
| 43 || May 25 || Blue Jays || 6–11 || Wells (8–2) || Schourek (2–4) || — || Fenway Park || 32,716 || 26–17 || L1 
|- style="text-align:center; background-color:#bfb"
| 44 || May 26 || @ Yankees || 4–1 || R. Martínez (4–3) || Cone (1–4) || Lowe (10) || Yankee Stadium || 54,470 || 27–17 || W1 
|- style="text-align:center; background-color:#fbb"
| 45 || May 27 || @ Yankees || 3–8 || Stanton (1–0) || Wasdin (0–1) || — || Yankee Stadium || 55,671 || 27–18 || L1 
|- style="text-align:center; background-color:#bfb"
| 46 || May 28 ||  @ Yankees || 2–0 || P. Martínez (8–2) || Clemens (4–5) || — || Yankee Stadium || 55,339 || 28–18 || W1 
|- style="text-align:center; background-color:#bfb"
| 47 || May 30 || Royals || 8–2 || Fassero (6–1) || Suppan (2–5) || — || Fenway Park || 31,861 || 29–18 || W2 
|- style="text-align:center; background-color:#fbb"
| 48 || May 31 || Royals || 7–9 || Suzuki (2–0) || Schourek (2–5) || Spradlin (5) || Fenway Park || 32,503 || 29–19 || L1 
|-

|- style="text-align:center; background-color:#fbb;"
| 49 || June 1 || Royals || 11–13 || Santiago (5–2) || Lowe (2–2) || Reichert (1) || Fenway Park || 32,661 || 29–20 || L2 
|- style="text-align:center; background-color:#fbb;"
| 50 || June 2 || @ Phillies || 1–2 (11)|| Brantley (1–0) || Wasdin (0–2) || — || Veterans Stadium || 22,194 || 29–21 || L3
|- style="text-align:center; background-color:#fbb;"
| 51 || June 3 || @ Phillies || 3–9 || Wolf (5–4) || Wakefield (1–4) || — || Veterans Stadium || 31,131 || 29–22 || L4
|- style="text-align:center; background-color:#fbb"
| 52 || June 4 || @ Phillies || 5–6 (12)|| Schrenk (2–1) || Cormier (2–1) || — || Veterans Stadium || 27,382 || 29–23 || L5
|- style="text-align:center; background-color:#bfb"
| 53 || June 5 || @ Marlins || 3–2 || Wakefield (2–4) || Bones (1–1) || Lowe (11) || Pro Player Stadium || 12,523 || 30–23 || W1 
|- style="text-align:center; background-color:#bfb"
| 54 || June 6 || @ Marlins || 4–3 || R. Martínez (5–3) || Sánchez (4–5) || Lowe (12) || Pro Player Stadium || 14,225 || 31–23 || W2 
|- style="text-align:center; background-color:#fbb"
| 55 || June 7 ||  @ Marlins || 2–6 || Darensbourg (2–0) || Rose (3–3) || — || Pro Player Stadium || 17,088 || 31–24 || L1
|- style="text-align:center; background-color:#bfb"
| 56 || June 8 || Indians || 3–0 || P. Martínez (9–2) || Colón (6–3) || Lowe (13) || Fenway Park || 31,438 || 32–24 || W1 
|- style="text-align:center; background-color:#fbb"
| 57 || June 9 || @ Braves || 4–6 || Maddux (8–1) || Fassero (6–2) || Seánez (2) || Turner Field || 48,053 || 32–25 || L1
|- style="text-align:center; background-color:#fbb;"
| 58 || June 10 || @ Braves || 0–6 || Mulholland (6–5) || Schourek (2–6) || — || Turner Field || 49,420 || 32–26 || L2
|- style="text-align:center; background-color:#bfb;"
| 59 || June 11 || @ Braves || 5–3 || Garcés (2–0) || Seánez (2–4) || Lowe (14) || Turner Field || 47,437 || 33–26 || W1
|- style="text-align:center; background-color:#bbb"
| — || June 12 || @ Yankees  || colspan=8|Postponed (rain). Makeup date September 11.
|- style="text-align:center; background-color:#bfb;"
| 60 || June 13 || @ Yankees || 5–3 || Pichardo (1–0) || Hernández (6–5) || Lowe (15) || Yankee Stadium || 52,142 || 34–26 || W2
|- style="text-align:center; background-color:#fbb;"
| 61 || June 14 ||  @ Yankees || 1–2 || Grimsley (3–1) || Wakefield (2–5) || Rivera (15) || Yankee Stadium || 54,834 || 34–27 || L1 
|- style="text-align:center; background-color:#bfb;"
| 62 || June 16 || Blue Jays || 7–4 || Pichardo (2–0) || Escobar (5–8) || Lowe (16) || Fenway Park || 33,638 || 35–27 || W1
|- style="text-align:center; background-color:#fbb;"
| 63 || June 17 || Blue Jays || 10–11 || Wells (11–2) || R. Martínez (5–4) || Koch (14) || Fenway Park || 32,951 || 35–28 || L1
|- style="text-align:center; background-color:#fbb;"
| 64 || June 18 ||Blue Jays || 1–5 || Castillo (3–5) || Fassero (6–3) || Koch (15) || Fenway Park || 32,925 || 35–29 || L2
|- style="text-align:center; background-color:#fbb;"
| 65 || June 19 || Yankees || 22–1 || Mendoza (6–3) || Rose (3–4) || — || Fenway Park || 33,370 || 35–30 || L3 
|- style="text-align:center; background-color:#fbb;"
| 66 || June 20 || Yankees || 3–0 || Pettitte (7–3) || P. Martínez (9–3) || Rivera (16) || Fenway Park || 33,909 || 35–31 || L4
|- style="text-align:center; background-color:#bfb;"
| 67 || June 21 || Yankees || 9–7 || Garcés (3–0) || Grimsley (3–2) || — || Fenway Park || 32,958 || 36–31 || W1
|- style="text-align:center; background-color:#bfb"
| 68 || June 22 || Yankees || 4–2 || R. Martínez (6–4) || Westbrook (0–2) || Lowe (17) || Fenway Park || 33,774 || 37–31 || W2
|- style="text-align:center; background-color:#fbb"
| 69 || June 23 || @ Blue Jays || 4–5 || Castillo (4–5) || Wasdin (0–3) || Koch (16) || SkyDome || 28,198 || 37–32 || L1 
|- style="text-align:center; background-color:#fbb"
| 70 || June 24 || @ Blue Jays || 4–6 || Halladay (3–4) || Rose (3–5) || Koch (17) || SkyDome || 30,130 || 37–33 || L2
|- style="text-align:center; background-color:#fbb"
| 71 || June 25 || @ Blue Jays || 5–6 (13)|| DeWitt (1–0) || Florie (0–2) || — || SkyDome || 31,022 || 37–34 || L3
|- style="text-align:center; background-color:#fbb"
| 72 || June 27 || Orioles || 3–6 (10)|| Trombley (3–2) || Lowe (2–3) || — || Fenway Park || 32,813 || 37–35 || L4
|- style="text-align:center; background-color:#fbb"
| 73 || June 28 || Orioles || 7–8 (11)|| Mercedes (3–3) || Florie (0–3) || Groom (4) || Fenway Park || 33,834 || 37–36 || L5
|- style="text-align:center; background-color:#bfb;"
| 74 || June 29 || Orioles || 12–4 || Wakefield (3–5) || Erickson (3–6) || — || Fenway Park || 33,612 || 38–36 || W1
|- style="text-align:center; background-color:#fbb;"
| 75 || June 30 || @ White Sox || 4–10 || Parque (8–2) || Pichardo (2–1) || — || Comiskey Park || 32,157 || 38–37 || L1
|-

|- style="text-align:center; background-color:#fbb;"
| 76 || July 1 || @ White Sox || 2–7 || Sirotka (8–6) || Crawford (0–1) || — || Comiskey Park || 28,006 || 38–38 || L2
|- style="text-align:center; background-color:#fbb"
| 77 || July 2 || @ White Sox || 2–8 || Baldwin (11–3) || Schourek (2–7) || — || Comiskey Park || 32,934 || 38–39 || L3
|- style="text-align:center; background-color:#bfb"
| 78 || July 3 || @ Twins  || 11–8 || Pichardo (3–1) || Lincoln (0–2) || Lowe (18) || Metrodome || 13,128 || 39–39 || W1
|- style="text-align:center; background-color:#bfb"
| 79 || July 4 || @ Twins  || 14–4 || Wakefield (4–5) || Milton (8–3) || Florie (1) || Metrodome || 9,209 || 40–39 || W2
|- style="text-align:center; background-color:#bfb;"
| 80 || July 5 || @ Twins || 11–8 || Wasdin (1–3) || Redman (5–4) || Lowe (19) || Metrodome || 8,488 || 41–39 || W3
|- style="text-align:center; background-color:#bfb;"
| 81 || July 6 || @ Twins  || 8–7 || Crawford (1–1) || Radke (5–10) || — || Metrodome || 10,326 || 42–39 || W4
|- style="text-align:center; background-color:#fbb;"
| 82 || July 7 || Braves || 3–5 || Glavine (9–5) || Schourek (2–8) || Ligtenberg (7) || Fenway Park || 33,686 || 42–40 || L1
|- style="text-align:center; background-color:#fbb"
| 83 || July 8 || Braves || 1–5 || Mulholland (9–8) || R. Martínez (6–5) || — || Fenway Park || 33,311 || 42–41 || L2
|- style="text-align:center; background-color:#bfb"
| 84 || July 9 || Braves || 7–2 || Wakefield (5–5) || Millwood (5–8) || — || Fenway Park || 33,018 || 43–41 || W1 
|- style="text-align:center; background-color:#bfb"
| 85 || July 13 || Mets || 4–3 || Garcés (4–0) || Benítez (2–4) || — || Fenway Park || 33,894 || 44–41 || W2
|- style="text-align:center; background-color:#fbb"
| 86 || July 14 || Mets  || 4–6 || Mahomes (3–1) || Lowe (2–4) || Benítez (20) || Fenway Park || 33,293 || 44–42 || L1
|- style="text-align:center; background-color:#bfb"
| 87 || July 15 || Mets || 6–4 || R. Martínez (7–5) || Hampton (9–6) || Lowe (20) || Fenway Park || 33,213 || 45–42 || W1
|- style="text-align:center; background-color:#bfb"
| 88 || July 16 || Expos || 5–2 || Wakefield (6–5) || Johnson (4–4) || Wasdin (1) || Fenway Park || 32,164 || 46–42 || W2
|- style="text-align:center; background-color:#bfb"
| 89 || July 17 || Expos || 7–3 || Pichardo (4–1) || Telford (5–4) || — || Fenway Park || 32,703 || 47–42 || W3
|- style="text-align:center; background-color:#bfb;"
| 90 || July 18 || Expos || 3–1 || P. Martínez (10–3) || Vázquez (7–5) || Lowe (21) || Fenway Park || 32,329 || 48–42 || W4
|- style="text-align:center; background-color:#bbb"
| — || July 19 || @ Orioles  || colspan=8|Postponed (rain). Makeup date July 20.
|- style="text-align:center; background-color:#bfb;"
| 91 || July 20 (1)|| @ Orioles || 11–7 || R. Martínez (8–5) || Ponson (5–6) || — || Camden Yards || 42,048 || 49–42 || W5
|- style="text-align:center; background-color:#fbb;"
| 92 || July 20 (2)|| @ Orioles || 4–9 || Erickson (5–7) || Schourek (2–9) || — || Camden Yards || 46,167 || 49–43 || L1
|- style="text-align:center; background-color:#fbb;"
| 93 || July 21 || White Sox || 5–8 || Simas (2–2) || Pichardo (4–2) || Howry (5) || Fenway Park || 33,869 || 49–44 || L2
|- style="text-align:center; background-color:#bfb;"
| 94 || July 22 || White Sox || 8–6 || Fassero (7–3) || Garland (1–2) || — || Fenway Park || 33,384 || 50–44 || W1
|- style="text-align:center; background-color:#bfb"
| 95 || July 23 || White Sox || 1–0 || P. Martínez (11–3) || Sirotka (9–8) || — || Fenway Park || 33,224 || 51–44 || W2
|- style="text-align:center; background-color:#fbb"
| 96 || July 24 || Twins || 2–4 || Milton (9–6) || Ohka (0–1) || — || Fenway Park || 33,469 || 51–45 || L1
|- style="text-align:center; background-color:#fbb"
| 97 || July 25 || Twins || 2–4 || Mays (6–11) || R. Martínez (8–6) || Guardado (6) || Fenway Park || 33,668 || 51–46 || L2
|- style="text-align:center; background-color:#bbb"
| — || July 26 || Twins  || colspan=8|Postponed (rain). Makeup date September 7.
|- style="text-align:center; background-color:#bfb"
| 98 || July 27 || @ Athletics || 5–4 (10)|| Garcés (5–0) || Tam (3–3) || Lowe (22) || Network Associates Coliseum || 19,343 || 52–46 || W1
|- style="text-align:center; background-color:#bfb"
| 99 || July 28 || @ Athletics || 4–1 || P. Martínez (12–3) || Mulder (6–7) || Lowe (23) || Network Associates Coliseum || 28,072 || 53–46 || W2
|- style="text-align:center; background-color:#fbb"
| 100 || July 29 || @ Athletics || 1–12 || Appier (9–8) || Fassero (7–4) || — || Network Associates Coliseum || 36,325 || 53–47 || L1
|- style="text-align:center; background-color:#fbb"
| 101 || July 30 || @ Athletics || 2–5 || Heredia (13–7) || Arrojo (5–10) || Isringhausen (23) || Network Associates Coliseum || 29,847 || 53–48 || L2
|- style="text-align:center; background-color:#bfb"
| 102 || July 31 || @ Mariners || 8–5 || Garcés (6–0) || Mesa (3–6) || Pichardo (1) || Safeco Field || 36,993 || 54–48 || W1
|-

|- style="text-align:center; background-color:#fbb"
| 103 || August 1 || @ Mariners || 4–5 (19)|| Sasaki (2–5) || Fassero (7–5) || — || Safeco Field || 37,391 || 54–49 || L1
|- style="text-align:center; background-color:#bfb"
| 104 || August 2 || @ Mariners || 5–2 || P. Martínez (13–3) || García (3–2) || — || Safeco Field || 45,121 || 55–49 || W1
|- style="text-align:center; background-color:#bfb"
| 105 || August 4 || Royals || 5–4 || Garcés (7–0) || Larkin (0–1) || Lowe (24) || Fenway Park || 33,702 || 56–49 || W2
|- style="text-align:center; background-color:#fbb"
| 106 || August 5 || Royals || 5–7 || Meadows (8–8) || Cormier (2–2) || Bottalico (10) || Fenway Park || 31,441 || 56–50 || L1
|- style="text-align:center; background-color:#fbb;"
| 107 || August 6 || Royals || 1–3 || Reichert (5–6) || Wakefield (6–6) || Bottalico (11) || Fenway Park || 33,442 || 56–51 || L2
|- style="text-align:center; background-color:#fbb;"
| 108 || August 7 || @ Angels || 1–4 || Washburn (7–2) || Ohka (0–2) || Hasegawa (4) || Edison Field || 23,078 || 56–52 || L3
|- style="text-align:center; background-color:#fbb;"
| 109 || August 8 || @ Angels || 1–2 || Ortiz (4–2) || P. Martínez (13–4) || — || Edison Field || 27,293 || 56–53 || L4
|- style="text-align:center; background-color:#bfb;"
| 110 || August 9 || @ Angels || 4–2 || Fassero (8–5) || Wise (0–1) || Lowe (25) || Edison Field || 25,334 || 57–53 || W1
|- style="text-align:center; background-color:#bfb;"
| 111 || August 11 || @ Rangers || 7–3 || Arrojo (6–10) || Glynn (3–2) || — || The Ballpark at Arlington || 39,991 || 58–53 || W2
|- style="text-align:center; background-color:#fbb;"
| 112 || August 12 || @ Rangers || 3–6 || Helling (14–8) || Wakefield (6–7) || — || The Ballpark at Arlington || 43,822 || 58–54 || L1
|- style="text-align:center; background-color:#bfb;"
| 113 || August 13 || @ Rangers || 4–2 || Ohka (1–2) || Rogers (11–10) || Lowe (26) || The Ballpark at Arlington || 28,927 || 59–54 || W1
|- style="text-align:center; background-color:#bfb;"
| 114 || August 14 || Devil Rays || 7–3 || Lowe (3–4) || Taylor (1–2) || — || Fenway Park || 32,174 || 60–54 || W1
|- style="text-align:center; background-color:#fbb;"
| 115 || August 15 || Devil Rays || 1–3 || Sturtze (4–2) || Fassero (8–6) || Hernández (22) || Fenway Park || 33,015 || 60–55 || L1
|- style="text-align:center; background-color:#bfb"
| 116 || August 16 || Devil Rays || 4–3 || Arrojo (7–10) || Wilson (0–2) || Lowe (27) || Fenway Park || 31,467 || 61–55 || W1
|- style="text-align:center; background-color:#bfb"
| 117 || August 17 || Rangers || 8–7 || Garcés (8–0) || Wetteland (4–5) || — || Fenway Park || 33,510 || 62–55 || W2
|- style="text-align:center; background-color:#bfb"
| 118 || August 18 || Rangers || 6–4 || Ohka (2–2) || Rogers (11–11) || Lowe (28) || Fenway Park || 33,009 || 63–55 || W3
|- style="text-align:center; background-color:#fbb"
| 119 || August 19 || Rangers || 9–0 || P. Martínez (14–4) || Perisho (2–6) || — || Fenway Park || 33,222 || 64–55 || W4
|- style="text-align:center; background-color:#fbb"
| 120 || August 20 || Rangers || 2–6 || Davis (5–4) || Fassero (8–7) || — || Fenway Park || 32,467 || 64–56 || L1
|- style="text-align:center; background-color:#bfb"
| 121 || August 21 || Angels || 7–6 (11)|| Lowe (4–4) || Holtz (1–3) || — || Fenway Park || 32,795 || 65–56 || W1
|- style="text-align:center; background-color:#fbb"
| 122 || August 22 || Angels || 4–11 || Mercker (1–2) || Wakefield (6–8) || — || Fenway Park || 33,163 || 65–57 || L1
|- style="text-align:center; background-color:#bfb;"
| 123 || August 23 || Angels || 3–1 || Ohka (3–2) || Ortiz (4–4) || Lowe (29) || Fenway Park || 32,958 || 66–57 || W1
|- style="text-align:center; background-color:#bfb;"
| 124 || August 24 || @ Royals || 9–7 (10)|| Pichardo (5–2) || Larkin (0–2) || Lowe (30) || Kauffman Stadium || 18,928 || 67–57 || W2
|- style="text-align:center; background-color:#fbb;"
| 125 || August 25 ||  @ Royals || 2–6 || Suppan (7–7) || Florie (0–4) || — || Kauffman Stadium || 20,028 || 67–58 || L1
|- style="text-align:center; background-color:#bfb"
| 126 || August 26 || @ Royals || 5–3 || Arrojo (8–10) || Meadows (9–10) || Lowe (31) || Kauffman Stadium || 30,199 || 68–58 || W1
|- style="text-align:center; background-color:#fbb"
| 127 || August 27 || @ Royals || 7–11 || Reichert (8–6) || Wakefield (6–9) || — || Kauffman Stadium || 17,037 || 68–59 || L1
|- style="text-align:center; background-color:#fbb;"
| 128 || August 28 || @ Devil Rays || 2–5 || Rekar (5–9) || Pichardo (5–3) || Hernández (26) || Tropicana Field || 17,721 || 68–60 || L2
|- style="text-align:center; background-color:#bfb;"
| 129 || August 29 || @ Devil Rays || 8–0 || P. Martínez (15–4) || Eiland (2–2) || — || Tropicana Field || 17,450 || 69–60 || W1
|- style="text-align:center; background-color:#fbb;"
| 130 || August 30 || @ Devil Rays || 1–3 || Lopez (11–9) || Fassero (8–8) || Hernández (27) || Tropicana Field || 15,043 || 69–61 || L1
|-

|- style="text-align:center; background-color:#bfb;"
| 131 || September 1 || Mariners || 6–2 || Arrojo (9–10) || Halama (11–7) || — || Fenway Park || 33,021 || 70–61 || W1
|- style="text-align:center; background-color:#fbb;"
| 132 || September 2 || Mariners || 1–4 || García (5–4) || Garcés (8–1) || Sasaki (31) || Fenway Park || 31,830 || 70–62 || L1
|- style="text-align:center; background-color:#fbb;"
| 133 || September 3 || Mariners || 0–5 || Abbott (9–5) || Ohka (3–3) || Paniagua (4) || Fenway Park || 32,668 || 70–63 || L2
|- style="text-align:center; background-color:#bfb;"
| 134 || September 4 || Mariners || 5–1 || P. Martínez (16–4) || Moyer (11–9) || — || Fenway Park || 32,619 || 71–63 || W1
|- style="text-align:center; background-color:#bfb;"
| 135 || September 5 || Athletics || 10–3 || Schourek (3–9) || Appier (12–11) || — || Fenway Park || 31,825 || 72–63 || W2
|- style="text-align:center; background-color:#fbb"
| 136 || September 6 || Athletics || 4–6 || Mulder (8–10) || Arrojo (9–11) || Mecir (5) || Fenway Park || 31,262 || 72–64 || L1
|- style="text-align:center; background-color:#bfb"
| 137 || September 7 || Twins || 11–6 || R. Martínez (9–6) || Milton (12–9) || — || Fenway Park || 32,283 || 73–64 || W1
|- style="text-align:center; background-color:#fbb"
| 138 || September 8 || Yankees || 0–4 || Clemens (12–6) || Ohka (3–4) || — || Fenway Park || 33,861 || 73–65 || L1
|- style="text-align:center; background-color:#fbb"
| 139 || September 9 || Yankees || 3–5 || Pettitte (18–7) || P. Martínez (16–5) || — || Fenway Park || 33,355 || 73–66 || L2
|- style="text-align:center; background-color:#fbb"
| 140 || September 10 || Yankees || 2–6 || Keisler (1–0) || Schourek (3–10) || Gooden (2) || Fenway Park || 33,062 || 73–67 || L3
|- style="text-align:center; background-color:#bfb"
| 141 || September 11 || @ Yankees || 4–0 || Arrojo (10–11) || Hernández (11–11) || Lowe (32) || Yankee Stadium || 40,326 || 74–67 || W1
|- style="text-align:center; background-color:#bfb"
| 142 || September 12 || @ Indians || 8–6 || R. Martínez (10–6) || Finley (12–11) || Lowe (33) || Jacobs Field || 42,714 || 75–67 || W2
|- style="text-align:center; background-color:#fbb"
| 143 || September 13 || @ Indians || 3–10 || Colón (13–8) || Ohka (3–5) || — || Jacobs Field || 42,667 || 75–68 || L1
|- style="text-align:center; background-color:#bfb"
| 144 || September 14 || @ Indians  || 7–4 || P. Martínez (17–5) || Nagy (2–5) || Lowe (34) || Jacobs Field || 42,709 || 76–68 || W1
|- style="text-align:center; background-color:#bfb;"
| 145 || September 15 || @ Tigers  || 7–6 || Beck (1–0) || Cruz (5–2) || Lowe (35) || Comerica Park || 33,785 || 77–68 || W2
|- style="text-align:center; background-color:#bfb;"
| 146 || September 16 (1) || @ Tigers || 8–5 || Pichardo (6–3) || Anderson (3–2) || Lowe (36) || Comerica Park || 32,882 || 78–68 || W3 
|- style="text-align:center; background-color:#fbb;"
| 147 || September 16 (2)|| @ Tigers || 2–12 || Nomo (7–11) || Ontiveros (0–1) || — || Comerica Park || 24,216 || 78–69 || L1 
|- style="text-align:center; background-color:#fbb;"
| 148 || September 17 || @ Tigers  || 4–5 || Mlicki (6–11) || R. Martínez (10–7)  || Jones (39) || Comerica Park || 33,174 || 78–70 || L2
|- style="text-align:center; background-color:#bfb;"
| 149 || September 19 || Indians  || 7–4 || Beck (2–0) || Nagy (2–6) || Lowe (37) || Fenway Park || 32,512 || 79–70 || W1
|- style="text-align:center; background-color:#fbb;"
| 150 || September 20 (1) || Indians  || 1–2 || Woodard (3–10) || P. Martínez (17–6) || Wickman (27) || Fenway Park || 33,002 || 79–71 || L1
|- style="text-align:center; background-color:#fbb"
| 151 || September 20 (2)|| Indians || 4–5 || Karsay (5–8) || Cormier (2–3) || Wickman (28) || Fenway Park || 32,751 || 79–72 || L2
|- style="text-align:center; background-color:#bfb"
| 152 || September 21 (1)|| Indians || 9–8 || Ontiveros (1–1) || Speier (4–2) || Lowe (38) || Fenway Park || 31,404 || 80–72 || W1
|- style="text-align:center; background-color:#fbb"
| 153 || September 21 (2)|| Indians || 5–8 || Finley (14–11) || Wakefield (6–10) || — || Fenway Park || 32,743 || 80–73 || L1
|- style="text-align:center; background-color:#fbb"
| 154 || September 22 || Orioles || 1–3 || Ponson (9–12) || R. Martínez (10–8) || — || Fenway Park || 32,708 || 80–74 || L2
|- style="text-align:center; background-color:#bfb"
| 155 || September 23 || Orioles || 8–7 (10)|| Carrasco (5–3) || Kohlmeier (0–1) || — || Fenway Park || 32,273 || 81–74 || W1
|- style="text-align:center; background-color:#fbb"
| 156 || September 24 || Orioles || 0–1 || Mussina (10–15) || Ohka (3–6) || Kohlmeier (12) || Fenway Park || 32,183 || 81–75 || L1
|- style="text-align:center; background-color:#bfb"
| 157 || September 26 || @ White Sox || 4–3 || P. Martínez (18–6) || Beirne (1–3) || Lowe (39) || Comiskey Park || 23,139 || 82–75 || W1
|- style="text-align:center; background-color:#bfb"
| 158 || September 27 || @ White Sox || 2–1 || Crawford (2–1) || Baldwin (14–6) || Lowe (40) || Comiskey Park || 16,368 || 83–75 || W2
|- style="text-align:center; background-color:#bfb"
| 159 || September 28 || @ White Sox || 7–6 || Beck (3–0) || Simas (2–3) || Lowe (41) || Comiskey Park || 18,326 || 84–75 || W3
|- style="text-align:center; background-color:#fbb"
| 160 || September 29 || @ Devil Rays || 6–8 || Yan (7–8) || Carrasco (5–4) || Hernández (32) || Tropicana Field || 18,290 || 84–76 || L1
|- style="text-align:center; background-color:#bfb"
| 161 || September 30 || @ Devil Rays || 4–2 || Cormier (3–3) || Hernández (4–7) || Lowe (42) || Tropicana Field || 23,447 || 85–76 || W1
|- style="text-align:center; background-color:#fbb"
| 162 ||October 1 || @ Devil Rays || 2–3 (10)|| Wheeler (1–1) || Croushore (2–1) || — || Tropicana Field || 28,043 || 85–77 || L1
|-

|Reference:

Awards and honors 
Awards
 Pedro Martínez – AL Pitcher of the Month (April)

Accomplishments
 Pedro Martínez – Lowest WHIP, (0.74)

All-Star Game
 Carl Everett, reserve OF
 Nomar Garciaparra, reserve SS
 Derek Lowe, reserve P
 Pedro Martínez, reserve P (did not attend)

Farm system 

In addition to the DSL Red Sox, the team shared a DSL team with the Arizona Diamondbacks.

VSL cooperative was with the Milwaukee Brewers and Minnesota Twins.

Source:

References

External links 
 2000 Boston Red Sox team page at Baseball Reference
 2000 Boston Red Sox season at baseball-almanac.com
 2000 Boston Red Sox Draft Selections

Boston Red Sox seasons
Boston Red Sox
Boston Red Sox
Red Sox